The 12th Annual NFL Honors was an awards presentation by the National Football League that honored its players from the 2022 NFL season. It was held on February 9, 2023, at the Phoenix Symphony Hall in Phoenix, Arizona. It aired on NBC (with Peacock streaming the ceremony) and NFL Network. Kelly Clarkson hosted, making her the first woman to host the presentation.

List of award winners

References

NFL Honors 011
2022 National Football League season
2023 in American football